Kostas Kazakos (alt. sp. Costas Kazakos; 29 May 1935 – 13 September 2022) was a Greek actor, television director, and politician.

He was married to the famous actress Tzeni Karezi for 24 years until her death in 1992 at 60 years old. Together they acted in a number of films, had a son, and were well loved and respected actors. In 1997 he married the actress Jenny Jolia and they eventually had three surviving children. The couple also had a daughter who died at June 25, 1999, when she was eight months old.

In the 2007 Greek legislative election, he was elected to the Greek Parliament as a candidate of the Communist Party of Greece. He was reelected in 2009.

Kazakos continued to act, and be involved in Greek politics until his death. After many hospitalizations at "Evangelismos" hospital the summer of 2022, died on September 13, 2022, at the age of 87, due to health problems.

Selected filmography
 Enas delikanis (1963)
 Act of Reprisal (1964)
 Bullets don't come back (1967)
 Iphigenia (1977)
 The Man with the Carnation (1980)

References

 Who's Who (Greek) 1979 p. 226.

External Links
 
 

1935 births
2022 deaths
20th-century Greek male actors
21st-century Greek male actors
People from Pyrgos, Elis
Communist Party of Greece politicians
Greek male film actors
Greek male television actors
Greek film directors
Greek MPs 2007–2009
Greek MPs 2009–2012
Greek actor-politicians